Teodor Cojocaru (born 3 May 1879 in Bubuieci; died 23 January 1941 in Chișinău) was a Moldovan military and politician. He served as Director General for Armed Forces in the Pantelimon Erhan Cabinet, and as a member of the Sfatul Țării and Romanian Parliament, and was the mayor of Chișinău from 1919 until 1920. Teodor Cojocaru was also a deputy in the Romanian Parliament for a short period between 1919-1920.

Biography

Its interaction with Soviet hordes
On 13 August 1940 he was arrested by the Soviet authorities, being abusively accused of committing crimes under Articles 54-4, 54-13 and 54-11 of the Criminal Code of the Ukrainian SSR. He died in Prison No. 1 in Chișinău.

References 
 Enciclopedia Chișinău. – Ch., 1997. – 156 p.

External links 
 Primari ai orașului Chișinău - Departamentul „Memoria Chișinăului” al Bibliotecii Municipale „B.P. Hașdeu”
10+3 primari ai Chișinăului, vipmagazin.md

 

1879 births
1941 deaths
People from Kishinyovsky Uyezd
National Moldavian Party politicians
Moldovan Ministers of Defense
Moldovan MPs 1917–1918
Mayors of Chișinău
Moldovan prisoners and detainees